Fizz buzz is a group word game for children to teach them about division. Players take turns to count incrementally, replacing any number divisible by three with the word "fizz", and any number divisible by five with the word "buzz", and any number divisible by both 3 and 5 with the word "fizzbuzz".

Play 
Players generally sit in a circle. The player designated to go first says the number "1", and the players then count upwards in turn. However, any number divisible by three is replaced by the word fizz and any number divisible by five by the word buzz. Numbers divisible by both three and five (i.e. divisible by 15) become fizz buzz. A player who hesitates or makes a mistake is eliminated.

For example, a typical round of fizz buzz would start as follows:

Other variations 
In some versions of the game, other divisibility rules such as 7 can be used instead. Another rule that may be used to complicate the game is where numbers containing a digit also trigger the corresponding rule (for instance, 52 would use the same rule for a number divisible by 5).

Programming 
Fizz buzz (often spelled FizzBuzz in this context) has been used as an interview screening device for computer programmers. Writing a program to output the first 100 FizzBuzz numbers is a relatively trivial problem requiring little more than a loop and conditional statements. However, its value in coding interviews is to analyze fundamental coding habits that may be indicative of overall coding ingenuity.

References

External links 
 About.com: Bizz Buzz- The Drinking Thinking Game
 Rosetta Code: Fizz Buzz at Rosetta Code
 Fizz Buzz JavaScript  interview code
 Euler's FizzBuzz, an unorthodox programmatic solution making use of Euler's theorem
 Enterprise FizzBuzz, Comical 'enterprise' implementation of FizzBuzz with intentional verbosity

Car games
Children's games
Drinking games
Mathematical games
Division (mathematics)